Benetice is a municipality and village in Třebíč District in the Vysočina Region of the Czech Republic. It has about 200 inhabitants.

Administrative parts
The village of Věstoňovice is an administrative part of Benetice.

References

External links

Villages in Třebíč District